Lost Song may refer to:

Lost Song (TV series), a 2018 Japanese anime series
Lost Song (film), a 2008 Canadian film
Sword Art Online: Lost Song, a 2015 Japanese video game

See also
Lost Songs (disambiguation)
Lost (disambiguation), for songs named "Lost"